The 19th Air Refueling Squadron (19 ARS) is an inactive unit of the United States Air Force. At the time of its inactivation, it was based at Otis Air Force Base.

On 19 Sep 1985 the 19th Air Refueling Squadron,(Medium), was consolidated with the 19th Ferrying Squadron, a unit that was last active 31 Mar 1944. This action was directed by Department of the Air Force Letter DAF/MPM 662q Attachment 2 (Inactive Units), 19 Sep 1985. The Consolidated Unit will retain the Designation of 19th Air Refueling Squadron, Heavy".

History

Operations
World War II

Lineage
 19th Ferrying Squadron
 Constituted as the 19th Air Corps Ferry Squadron on 18 February 1942
 Activated on 4 June 1942
 Redesignated 19th Ferrying Squadron c. 12 May 1943
 Disbanded on 31 March 1944
 Consolidated with the 19th Air Refueling Squadron on 19 September 1985 as the 19th Air Refueling Squadron, Heavy

 19th Air Refueling Squadron
 Constituted as the 19th Air Refueling Squadron, Medium in 1956
 Activated on 1 February 1956
 Inactivated on 25 June 1966
 Consolidated with the 19th Ferrying Squadron on 19 September 1985 as the 19th Air Refueling Squadron, Heavy

Assignments
 3rd Ferrying Group, 4 June 1942 – 31 March 1944
 19th Bombardment Wing, 1 February 1956 (attached to 379th Bombardment Wing until 30 June 1956)
 4050th Air Refueling Wing, 1 April 1960
 4038th Strategic Wing, April 1961
 397th Bombardment Wing, 1 February 1963
 499th Air Refueling Wing, 15 June 1963
 817th Air Division, 1 July 1964 – 25 June 1966

Stations
 Romulus Army Air Base, Michigan, 4 June 1942 – 31 March 1944
 Homestead Air Force Base, Florida, 1 February 1956 (deployed to Ben Guerir Air Base, Morocco 1957; Lajes Air Base, Azores Islands, Portugal 1958)
 Otis Air Force Base, Massachusetts, 1 April 1960 – 25 June 1966 (deployed to RAF Brize Norton, England, 1963; RAF Fairford, England, 1963; Sondrestrom Air Base, Greenland, 1962–1963)

Aircraft
Boeing KC-97 Stratofreighter (1956–1966)

References

Notes
 Explanatory notes

 Citations

Bibliography

External links
19th Air Refueling Squadron (Archived 2009-10-22)

Military units and formations in Massachusetts
019